The commune of Kigamba is a commune of Cankuzo Province in north-eastern Burundi. The capital lies at Kigamba.

References

Communes of Burundi
Cankuzo Province